Cerulenin is an antifungal antibiotic that inhibits fatty acid and steroid biosynthesis. It was the first natural product antibiotic known to inhibit lipid synthesis. In fatty acid synthesis, it has been reported to bind in equimolar ratio to b-keto-acyl-ACP synthase, one of the seven moieties of fatty acid synthase, blocking the interaction of malonyl-CoA.  It also has the related activity of stimulating fatty acid oxidation through the activation of CPT1, another enzyme normally inhibited by malonyl-CoA.  Inhibition involves covalent thioacylation that permanently inactivates the enzymes.  These two behaviors may increase the availability of energy in the form of ATP, perhaps sensed by AMPK, in the hypothalamus.

In sterol synthesis, cerulenin inhibits HMG-CoA synthetase activity. It was also reported that cerulenin specifically inhibited fatty acid biosynthesis in Saccharomyces cerevisiae without having an effect on sterol formation. But in general conclusion, cerulenin has inhibitory effects on sterol synthesis.

Cerulenin causes a dose-dependent decrease in HER2/neu protein levels in breast cancer cells, from 14% at 1.25 to 78% at 10 milligrams per liter, and targeting of fatty acid synthase by related drugs has been suggested as a possible treatment.  Antiproliferative and pro-apoptotic effects have been shown in colon cells as well.  At an intraperitoneal dose of 30 milligrams per kilogram, it has been shown to inhibit feeding and induce dramatic weight loss in mice by a mechanism similar to, but independent or downstream of, leptin signaling.  It is found naturally in the industrial strain Cephalosporium caerulens (Sarocladium oryzae, the sheath rot pathogen of rice).

See also
 Satoshi Ōmura

References

External links 
 Cerulenin from  Fermentek

Antifungals
Carboxamides
Ketones
Alkene derivatives
Epoxides